This is a timeline documenting events of jazz in the year 1982.

Events

April
 2 – The 9th Vossajazz started in Voss, Norway (April 2 – 4).

May
 26 – 10th Nattjazz started in Bergen, Norway (May 26 – June 9).
 28 – 11th Moers Festival started in Moers, Germany (May 28 – 31).

June
 2 – The 3rd Montreal International Jazz Festival started in Montreal, Quebec, Canada (July  2 – 11).

July
 9 – The 16th Montreux Jazz Festival started in Montreux, Switzerland (July 9 – 31).
 16 – The 7th North Sea Jazz Festival started in The Hague, Netherlands (July 16 – 18).

September
 17 – The 25th Monterey Jazz Festival started in Monterey, California (September 17 – 19).

Album releases

Anthony Davis: Variations In Dream-time
Henry Threadgill: When Was That?
Air: 80° Below '82
Billy Bang: Outline No 12
Dave Holland: Life Cycle
David Murray: Murray's Steps
Jane Ira Bloom: Mighty Lights
Lol Coxhill: Instant Replay
Dewey Redman: The Struggle Continues
Steve Lacy: Flame
Elements: Elements
Errol Parker: Tentet
James Ulmer: Black Rock
Joe McPhee: Oleo
John Carter: Dauwhe
Sonny Simmons: Backwoods Suite
Steps Ahead: Paradox
Tony Coe: Tournee Du Chat
Ronald Shannon Jackson: Mandance
Warren Vaché: Midtown Jazz
Paul Winter: Missa Gaia/Earth Mass
Cecil McBee: Flying Out
Shadowfax: Shadowfax
Jack DeJohnette: Inflation Blues
Stanley Jordan: Touch Sensitive
Kevin Eubanks: Guitarist 
Michael Franks: Objects of Desire
Hugh Masekela: Home
Claus Ogerman and Michael Brecker: Cityscape

Deaths

 January
 9 – Vido Musso, Italian-American tenor saxophonist, clarinetist, and bandleader (born 1913).

 February
 7 – Joseph Reinhardt, French guitarist and composer (born 1912).
 17 – Thelonious Monk, American pianist and composer (born 1917).
 26 – Gábor Szabó, Hungarian guitarist (born 1936).

 March
 9 – Leonid Utyosov, Soviet singer and comic actor (born 1895).
 23 – Sonny Greer, American drummer and vocalist (born 1895).

 May
 5 – Cal Tjader, American vibraphonist, drummer, and percussionist (born 1925).

 June
 11 – Al Rinker, American singer and composer (born 1907).
 15 – Art Pepper, American alto saxophonist and clarinetist (born 1925).
 25 – Alex Welsh, Scottish singer, cornetist, and trumpeter (born 1929).

 July
 9 – Wingy Manone, American trumpeter, composer, singer, and bandleader (born 1900).
 22 – Sonny Stitt, American saxophonist (born 1924).

 October
 21 – Radka Toneff, Norwegian singer (born 1952).

 November
 11 – Gösta Törner, Swedish jazz trumpeter and bandleader (born 1912). 
 16 – Al Haig, American pianist (born 1922).

 December
 17 – Big Joe Williams, American guitarist, singer, and songwriter (born 1903).

Births

 January
 1 – Andreas Lønmo Knudsrød, Norwegian drummer, Splashgirl.

 February
 4 – Hedvig Mollestad Thomassen, Norwegian guitarist, singer, and composer.
 5 – Marco Di Meco, Italian flautist, composer, music producer, and writer.
 13 – Even Helte Hermansen, Norwegian guitarist, Bushman's Revenge and Red Kite.

 March
 8 – Isak Strand, Norwegian drummer, electronica artist, and sound engineer, Me At Sea.
 9 – Erica von Kleist, American flautist, saxophonist, and composer.

 April
 2 – Daniel Herskedal, Norwegian tubist.
 3 – Irene Kepl, Austrian violinist and composer.
 9 – Øyvind Skarbø, Norwegian drummer and composer.
 13 – Nellie McKay, British comedian, singer, songwriter, actor, and composer.
 30 – Tyler Gilmore, American composer and orchestra conductor.

 May
 1 – Ambrose Akinmusire, American trumpeter.
 23
 Malene Mortensen, Danish singer.
 Martin Musaubach, Argentine band-leading pianist, composer, arranger and producer.

 July
 7 – Ferit Odman, Turkish drummer and composer.
 28 – Mariam Wallentin, Swedish singer, musician, composer, and voice actor.

 August

 September
 11 – Michel Reis, Luxembourgian jazz pianist and composer.

 October
 4 – YolanDa Brown, British saxophonist and composer.
 8 – Veronika Harcsa, Hungarian singer and songwriter.
 11 – Jonathan Fritzén, Swedish pianist and multi-instrumentalist.
 12 – Émile Parisien, French soprano saxophonist, alto saxophonist, and composer.

 November
 9 – Jamie Lenman, British guitarist, musician, songwriter, singer, and illustrator.

 December
 3 – Eric Darius, American saxophonist, vocalist, songwriter, and producer.
 17 – Stephan Meidell, Norwegian guitarist and composer.
 20 – Jessy J or Jessica Arellano, American saxophonist, flautist, singer, and pianist.

 Unknown date
 Daniel Zamir, Israeli saxophonist and singer.

See also

 1980s in jazz
 List of years in jazz
 1982 in music

References

External links 
 History Of Jazz Timeline: 1982 at All About Jazz

Jazz
Jazz by year